Letterkenny (LLS) railway station served the town of Letterkenny in County Donegal, Ireland.

The station opened on 30 June 1883 when the Londonderry and Lough Swilly Railway built their line from Londonderry Graving Dock to Letterkenny.

It was adjacent to the Letterkenny (CDR) railway station built by the County Donegal Railways Joint Committee and had a siding connection to the system of this company.

It closed on 3 June 1953 when the LLSR closed the line from Tooban Junction to Burtonport in an effort to save money.

Freight services continued until 1 July 1953.

Routes

References

1883 establishments in Ireland
1953 disestablishments in Ireland
Disused railway stations in County Donegal
Railway stations opened in 1883
Railway stations closed in 1953
LandLSR Railway
Railway stations in the Republic of Ireland opened in the 19th century